Alesha Zappitella (born February 28, 1995) is an American mixed martial artist. She is currently signed to the Invicta Fighting Championships, where she is a former Invicta FC Atomweight Champion.

Background
Growing up in Ohio, Alesha started wrestling – as the sole girl in boys' team – at the age of five. She also played softball, but quit it after her coach advised her to drop wrestling in order to focus in the "girl sport" which would get her somewhere. She went on to become a two-time Ohio state champion in girls wrestling, five-time All-American before eventually placing sixth in the 2016 U.S. Olympic Trials.

Mixed martial arts career

Invicta

Early Invicta career
Zappitella made her professional debut against Jayme Hinshaw at KOTC Equalizer on 15 October 2016. She won the fight by unanimous decision. She would go on to amass a 3–0 record, with a single no-contest, which earned her the notice of Invicta Fighting Championships. Invicta scheduled her debut against Shino VanHoose at Invicta FC 30: Frey vs. Grusander. VanHoose later withdrew from the bout and was replaced by Jillian DeCoursey. Zappitella won the bout by unanimous decision.

Zappitella was scheduled to fight Amber Brown at Invicta FC 33: Frey vs. Grusander II. She won the fight by unanimous decision.

Zappitella was scheduled to fight Viviane Pereira at Invicta FC 35: Bennett vs. Rodriguez II. Pereira missed the scales, weighing in 0.6 lbs over the atomweight limit. Zappitella lost for the first time in her professional career, as Pereira won the fight by unanimous decision.

Following her first loss, Zappitella briefly left Invicta, being scheduled to fight Kanna Asakura at RIZIN 18. Asakura won the fight by split decision.

Returning to Invicta, Zappitella was scheduled to fight Kelly D'Angelo at Invicta FC 39: Frey vs. Cummins II. Zappitella snapped her two-fight losing streak, winning the bout by unanimous decision.

Zappitella was scheduled to fight Lindsey VanZandt at Invicta FC 40: Ducote vs. Lima. Zappitella won the fight by split decision (28-29, 29–27, 30–27). The majority of media members scored the fight for Zappitella.

Invicta Atomweight title reign
Zappitella was scheduled to fight Ashley Cummins at Invicta FC 42: Cummins vs. Zappitella for the vacant Invicta FC Atomweight Championship. Cummins was the more dominant party throughout the first two rounds, winning the majority of striking exchanges and stopping Zappitella's takedowns. In the first minute of the third round, Zappitella managed to land an early takedown and countered Cummins' guillotine choke attempt with a Von Flue choke. It was the first Von Flue choke finish in Invicta FC history.

Zappitella made her first title defense against Jéssica Delboni at Invicta 44: Rodríguez vs. Torquato on May 21, 2021. She won the bout by a razor close split decision. Two of the judges scored the fight 48–47 in Zappitella's favor, while the third judge scored it 48–47 in Delboni's favor. All of the media members scored the fight for Delboni.

Zappitella rematched Jéssica Delboni on January 12, 2022, at Invicta FC 45. She lost the bout and the title via unanimous decision, with scores of 50–45, 50–45 and 49–46.

Move to strawweight
Moving up to Strawweight, Zappitella faced Emily Ducote for the Invicta FC Strawweight Championship on May 11, 2022, at Invicta FC 47. She lost the bout after doctors stopped the bout after the second round due to a cut on her eyelid.

Personal life
Zappitella works as a paraprofessional educator in the Howell Public Schools district. Zappitella also works as a women's self defense coach at the Michigan Institute of Athletics.

She is a fan and avid player of the collectible strategy card game Magic: The Gathering.

Championships and accomplishments

Wrestling
 2012 Vaughn Cadet National Championships Freestyle 105 lbs 3rd Place
 2013 Vaughn Cadet National Championships Freestyle 105 lbs 5th Place
 2016 USA Olympic Trials Freestyle 105 lbs Qualifier

Mixed Martial Arts
Invicta Fighting Championships
Invicta FC Atomweight Championship (one time; former)
One successful title defense
Performance of the Night (Three times)  vs. Jillian DeCoursey, Amber Brown and Ashley Cummins

Mixed martial arts record

|-
|Loss
|align=center| 9–4 (1)
|Emily Ducote
| TKO (doctor stoppage)
|Invicta FC 47: Ducote vs. Zappitella
|
|align=center|2
|align=center|5:00
|Kansas City, Kansas, United States
|
|-
| Loss
| align=center| 9–3 (1)
| Jéssica Delboni
| Decision (unanimous)
| Invicta FC 45: Zappitella vs. Delboni II
| 
| align=center| 5
| align=center| 5:00
| Kansas City, Kansas, United States
|
|-
| Win
| align=center| 9–2 (1)
| Jéssica Delboni
| Decision (split)
| Invicta FC 44: Rodríguez vs. Torquato
| 
| align=center| 5
| align=center| 5:00
| Kansas City, Kansas, United States
|
|-
| Win
| align=center| 8–2 (1)
| Ashley Cummins
| Submission (Von Flue choke)
| Invicta FC 42: Cummins vs. Zappitella
| 
| align=center| 4
| align=center| 1:20
| Kansas City, Kansas, United States
|
|-
| Win
| align=center| 7–2 (1)
| Lindsey VanZandt
| Decision (split)
| Invicta FC 40: Ducote vs. Lima
| 
| align=center| 3
| align=center| 5:00
| Kansas City, Kansas, United States
|
|-
| Win
| align=center| 6–2 (1)
| Kelly D'Angelo
| Decision (unanimous)
| Invicta FC 39: Frey vs. Cummins II
| 
| align=center| 3
| align=center| 5:00
| Kansas City, Kansas, United States
|
|-
| Loss
| align=center| 5–2 (1)
| Kanna Asakura
| Decision (split)
| RIZIN 18
| 
| align=center| 3
| align=center| 5:00
| Nagoya, Japan
|
|-
| Loss
| align=center| 5–1 (1)
| Viviane Pereira
| Decision (unanimous)
| Invicta FC 35: Bennett vs. Rodriguez II
| 
| align=center| 3
| align=center| 5:00
| Kansas City, Kansas, United States
| Catchweight (106.7 lbs) bout, Pereira missed weight.
|-
| Win
| align=center| 5–0 (1)
| Amber Brown
| Decision (unanimous)
| Invicta FC 33: Frey vs. Grusander II
| 
| align=center| 3
| align=center| 5:00
| Kansas City, Missouri, United States
|  Performance of the Night. 
|-
| Win
| align=center| 4–0 (1)
| Jillian DeCoursey
| Decision (unanimous)
| Invicta FC 30: Frey vs. Grusander
| 
| align=center| 3
| align=center| 5:00
| Kansas City, Missouri, United States
|  Performance of the Night. 
|-
| Win
|align=center|3–0 (1)
| Kyna Sisson
| Decision (split)
| WXC 71: Night of Champions 10
| 
|align=center| 3
|align=center| 5:00
| Southgate, Michigan, United States
| Strawweight bout.
|- 
| NC
|align=center|2–0 (1)
| Stephanie Alba
| No Contest (overturned)
| Combate 13
| 
|align=center| 3
|align=center| 5:00
| Tucson, Arizona, United States
| Decision win for Zappitella overturned due to testing positive for marijuana
|-
| Win
|align=center| 2–0
| Miao Ding
| Submission (arm-triangle choke)
| Kunlun Fight MMA 9
| 
|align=center| 2
|align=center| 1:17
| Sanya, China
| 
|-
| Win
|align=center|1–0
| Jayme Hinshaw
| Decision (unanimous)
| KOTC Equalizer
| 
|align=center| 3
|align=center| 5:00
| Lac du Flambeau, Wisconsin, United States
| 

|-
|Win
|align=center| 2–2–1
|Jessica Ertl
|Submission (Keylock)
|NAFC: Super Brawl
|
|align=center|1
|align=center|2:00
|Waukesha, Wisconsin, United States
|
|-
|Draw
|align=center| 1–2–1
|Tiffany Masters
|Draw (Decision)
|KOTC: Bitter Enemies
|
|align=center|3
|align=center|3:00
|Keshena, Wisconsin, United States
|
|-
|Loss
|align=center| 1–2
|Cynthia Arceo
|TKO (Punches)
|KOTC: Warriors
|
|align=center|1
|align=center|0:09
|Socorro, Texas, United States
|
|-
|Loss
|align=center| 1–1
|Kyna Sisson
|Submission (Triangle choke)
|WXC 56: College Throwdown
|
|align=center|2
|align=center|2:36
|Ypsilanti, Michigan, United States
|For the WXC Amateur Strawweight Championship.
|-
|Win
|align=center| 1–0
|Elane Santiago
|Decision (Unanimous)
|WXC 54: Night of Champions 7
|
|align=center|3
|align=center|3:00
|Southgate, Michigan, United States
|
|-
|}

See also
 List of female mixed martial artists
 List of current mixed martial arts champions
 List of current Invicta FC fighters

References

External links
 
 Alesha Zappitella at Invicta Fighting Championships

 

1993 births
Living people
Atomweight mixed martial artists
American female mixed martial artists
Strawweight mixed martial artists
Mixed martial artists utilizing collegiate wrestling
Mixed martial artists utilizing freestyle wrestling
Mixed martial artists utilizing Brazilian jiu-jitsu
American female sport wrestlers
Amateur wrestlers
American practitioners of Brazilian jiu-jitsu
Female Brazilian jiu-jitsu practitioners
People from Conneaut, Ohio
Sportspeople from Ohio
21st-century American women